Emilio Rivera (born February 24, 1961) is an American film and television actor and stand-up comedian. He is best known for his portrayal of Marcus Álvarez in Sons of Anarchy and its spin-off, Mayans M.C. He is also known for his depiction of criminals and law enforcement officers.

Early life

Rivera is of Mexican descent. He is the oldest sibling in his family, with four younger brothers and three younger sisters. He was raised in Elysian Valley also known as Frogtown, a neighborhood of Los Angeles, California. At 18 years old in 1979, Rivera enlisted in the U.S. Army.

Career

Rivera's first feature role was in the TV series Renegade with Lorenzo Lamas. He also had a role in the feature film Con Air, co-starring Nicolas Cage. Emilio has appeared in several commercials, television programs and feature films including Traffic, The Cable Guy, NYPD Blue, Beverly Hills, 90210, Walker, Texas Ranger, Titus, Hitman: Agent 47, JAG, ER, A Man Apart with Vin Diesel, John Cusack's film Never Get Outta the Boat, Ali G Indahouse, Rush, Howard Stern's Son of the Beach, Law and Order: Special Victims Unit, Z Nation, and Michael Mann's new series Metro. He also played Marcus Álvarez in Sons of Anarchy for seven seasons and currently plays Álvarez in Mayans M.C.

Personal life

Emilio has three children from a previous marriage.

Filmography

Film and TV Movies

Television

Music videos

References

External links
 
 
 
 
 
 
 Emilio Rivera at Hollywood.com

1961 births
Living people
20th-century American male actors
21st-century American male actors
American male actors of Mexican descent
American male film actors
American male television actors
American stand-up comedians
Hispanic and Latino American male actors
Male actors from Los Angeles
Male actors from San Antonio
Comedians from California
20th-century American comedians
21st-century American comedians